Tridactylina is a genus of flowering plants in the chamomile tribe within the daisy family.

Species
The only known species is  Tridactylina kirilowii, native to Siberia.

References

Flora of Siberia
Anthemideae
Monotypic Asteraceae genera
Endemic flora of Russia